Robert Frank (1924–2019) was an important figure in American photography and film.

Robert Frank may also refer to:
 Robert Frank (cricketer) (1864–1950), English first class cricketer
 Robert Frank (sculptor) (1902–1975), Swiss sculptor
 Robert Frank (SS officer) (1910–1944), German officer, Knight’s Cross recipient
 Robert H. Frank (born 1945), professor at Cornell University
 Robert G. Frank (born 1952), president of the University of New Mexico
 Robert Frank (table tennis) (born 1990), Australian table tennis player
 Whizzer (Robert Frank), a Golden Age comic book character
 Nuklo or Robert Frank Jr., a comic book character appearing in Marvel Comics

See also
 Bob Franke (born 1947), American singer-songwriter
 Robert Franco (disambiguation)
 Robert Franks (disambiguation)